Seifried Estate Winery is a family owned winery and vineyard based in Nelson, New Zealand. The winery was founded by Hermann Seifried and his wife Agnes in 1973 as a part time business, and is now the South Island's oldest commercial vineyard.

Using grapes harvested from estate grown, ‘Sustainably Accredited’ (Sustainable Winegrowing New Zealand – SWNZ) vineyards scattered throughout the Nelson region, this is now a second-generation wine producer, with siblings Heidi, Chris and Anna now working alongside their parents in various management positions within the family business.

Seifried Estate Winery farms over 325 hectares of vines around the Nelson and Marlborough region, and exports wine around the world. Seifried Estate Winery has gained a reputation for lesser known varieties including Grüner Veltliner, Zweigelt, and Würzer – a rare grape variety for which Seifried are the only NZ producer.

In September 2014, Hermann and Agnes Seifried were acknowledged for their contributions to New Zealand wine and inducted as Fellows of New Zealand Winegrowers. They are the first husband and wife team to be inducted and the first for a woman.

Wines 
Seifried Estate Winery produces wines under a range of brands including:
Seifried – premium estate label
Aotea – single estate grown
Old Coach Road
Rabbit Island.

Seifried Estate Wines produces wine styles that include Sauvignon blanc, Chardonnay, Pinot Noir, Syrah, Cabernet Franc, Riesling, Gewürztraminer, & Merlot. They also produce lesser known varieties including Grüner Veltliner, Zweigelt and Würzer.

Wineries 
Seifried Cellar Door is located at the winery in Appleby.

In popular culture
Seifried Estate Winery was one of the wineries feature in the 2019 documentary A Seat at the Table by David Nash and Simon Mark-Brown.

References

External links 
 Official Website
Nelson Wine Region
Taste Nelson Wines
NZ Winegrowers

Wineries of New Zealand
1973 establishments
Products introduced in 1973
Wine brands